The BMW S38 is a straight-6 DOHC petrol engine which replaced the M88 and was produced from 1984-1995. The S38 was originally produced for North America as an equivalent to the M88 with slightly lower power output. In 1989, power output of the S38 was increased and it became the worldwide replacement for the M88.

In 1998, the BMW M5 switched to the S62 V8 engine. There is therefore no direct successor to the S38, however the BMW S50 engine took over as BMW's high performance straight-6 engine.

Design 
The S38 is based on the M88/3 engine. Compared to the M88/3, the S38 has a lower compression ratio (9.8:1), simplified exhaust manifold, catalytic converter, dual-row timing chain and a shorter camshaft duration. As per the M88/3, the S38 uses a DOHC valvetrain with shim-and-bucket valve actuation. Air intake is via six individual throttle bodies with intake trumpets, fed by a cast aluminum intake plenum.

Versions

S38B35

Applications:
 1986-1987 E28 M5 - Canada, Japan and USA
 1986-1988 E24 M6 - Canada, Japan and USA
 1987-1989 E24 M635CSi - models with catalytic converter

S38B36
Other changes included revised camshafts, compression ratio increasing to 10:1, a variable-length inlet manifold (to improve low-rev torque), equal length stainless steel exhaust headers a hotwire mass airflow sensor (MAF) and Bosch Motronic engine management.

Applications:
 1988–1992 E34 M5 (worldwide)
 1989–1993 E34 M5 - Canada and US

S38B38

The engine management was upgraded to Motronic 3.3 and the ignition system was upgraded to coil-on-plug ignition.

Applications:
 1991-1995 E34 M5 - European-specification

References

S38
Straight-six engines
Gasoline engines by model